Assassination is a 1927 German silent thriller film directed by Richard Oswald and starring Eduard Rothauser, Mathilde Sussin and Hans Stüwe. It was adapted from a novel by Vicki Baum. It was shot at the EFA Studios in Berlin. The film's art direction was by Gustav A. Knauer.

Cast

References

Bibliography

External links
 

1927 films
Films of the Weimar Republic
1920s thriller films
German silent feature films
German thriller films
Films directed by Richard Oswald
Films based on Austrian novels
German black-and-white films
Silent thriller films
1920s German films
Films shot at Halensee Studios